Robert H. Whittaker may refer to:
 Robert Whittaker (ecologist), American plant ecologist
 Robert H. Whittaker (politician), member of the Virginia House of Delegates

See also
 Robert Whittaker (disambiguation)